Weiss v. United States, 510 U.S. 163 (1994), is a Supreme Court of the United States case which held that commissioned military officers, who are appointed by the president of the United States by and with the advice and consent of the United States Senate, may be assigned to act as military judges without the need to be confirmed a second time by the Senate.

Background 

The petitioner Eric J. Weiss was a member of the United States Marine Corps who pled guilty to one count of larceny in violation of the Uniform Code of Military Justice. Upon review, the Navy-Marine Corps Court of Military Review affirmed the conviction.

Weiss appealed to the Court of Military Appeals, arguing the judges in his case had no authority to convict him because they had not been properly appointed under the Appointments Clause. The military trial judge who presided over his case was assigned to the same by the case by the Judge Advocate General of the service from among those United States military officers appointed by the President and confirmed by the Senate. Weiss argued the assignment was invalid and that the military judge was required to be appointed by the President rather than assigned by the Judge Advocate General. The Court of Military Appeals rejected this argument, affirmed his conviction.

Decision 

A unanimous Supreme Court ruled against Weiss, holding the method of appointment of the military judge was constitutional. The Court began by ruling that military judges are officers of the United States because they exercise significant authority under the laws of the United States and, therefore, must be appointed in conformity with the Appointments Clause. However, all military judges, as military officers, are appointed by the President and confirmed the Senate. Weiss argued that, prior, to assuming duties as a military judge, the military officer had to be reappointed. The Court rejected this argument, holding that military officers may be assigned to different duties within the military without running afoul of the Appointments Clause as long as the new assignment is germane to the office for which they were originally appointed. As all military officer have a duty to exercise control over the armed forces, serving a military judge was germane.

External links 
 

1994 in United States case law
Appointments Clause case law
United States separation of powers case law
United States Supreme Court cases
United States Supreme Court cases of the Rehnquist Court